The 2014–15 Carolina Hurricanes season was the 43rd season for the major league ice hockey team; its 36th season in the National Hockey League since the NHL franchise was granted on June 22, 1979, and 17th season since the franchise relocated from Hartford to start the 1997–98 NHL season. The Hurricanes failed to make the playoffs for the sixth consecutive year.

Off-season
On May 5, 2014, the Hurricanes announced that head coach Kirk Muller, as well as assistant coaches John MacLean and Dave Lewis, were fired. The Hurricanes hired Bill Peters as their new head coach on June 19, 2014.

Standings

Schedule and results

Pre-season

Regular season

Player stats 
Final 
Skaters

Goaltenders

†Denotes player spent time with another team before joining the Hurricanes. Stats reflect time with the Hurricanes only.
‡Denotes player was traded mid-season. Stats reflect time with the Hurricanes only.
Bold/italics denotes franchise record.

Notable achievements

Awards

Milestones

Transactions 

The Hurricanes have been involved in the following transactions during the 2014–15 season.

Trades

Free agents acquired

Free agents lost

Claimed via waivers

Lost via waivers

Lost via retirement

Player signings

Draft picks

The 2014 NHL Entry Draft was held on June 27–28, 2014 at the Wells Fargo Center in Philadelphia, Pennsylvania. The Hurricanes will pick 7th overall in the first round.

Draft notes

 Vancouver's fourth-round pick went to Carolina, as the result of a trade on September 29, 2013, that sent Zac Dalpe and Jeremy Welsh to Vancouver, in exchange for Kellan Tochkin and this pick.
 Carolina's sixth-round pick went to the Los Angeles Kings, as the result of a trade on January 13, 2013, that sent Kevin Westgarth to Carolina, in exchange for Anthony Stewart, a fourth round pick in 2013, and this pick.

References

Carolina Hurricanes seasons
Carolina
Carolina Hurricanes season, 2014-15
Hurr
2015 in sports in North Carolina